The 6th Irish Film & Television Awards took place on 14 February 2009 at the Burlington Hotel in Dublin, and was hosted by Ryan Tubridy. It honoured Irish film and television released in 2008.

Awards in Film
Film
 Hunger (Winner)
 32A
 A Film with Me in It
 The Escapist
 Kisses

Director Film
 Lance Daly – Kisses (Winner)
 Ian Fitzgibbon – A Film with Me in It
 Martin McDonagh – In Bruges
 Declan Recks – Eden

Script Film
 Martin McDonagh – In Bruges (Winner)
 Lance Daly – Kisses
 Mark Doherty – A Film with Me in It
 Enda Walsh – Hunger

Actor in a Lead Role Film
 Michael Fassbender – Hunger (Winner)
 Colin Farrell – In Bruges
 Brendan Gleeson – In Bruges
 Dylan Moran – A Film with Me in It

Actress in a Lead Role Film
 Eileen Walsh – Eden (Winner)
 Jenn Murray – Dorothy
 Kelly O'Neill – Kisses
 Saoirse Ronan – City of Ember

Actor in a Supporting Role Film
 Liam Cunningham – Hunger (Winner)
 Stuart Graham – Hunger
 Gerard McSorley – Anton
 Peter O'Toole – Dean Spanley

Actress in a Supporting Role Film
 Saoirse Ronan – Death Defying Acts (Winner)
 Sarah Bolger – The Spiderwick Chronicles
 Lesley Conroy – Eden
 Ger Ryan – Dorothy

George Morrison Feature Documentary Award 
 Waveriders (Winner)
 Gabriel Byrne: Stories From Home
 Saviours
 Seaview

International Film
 In Bruges (Winner)
 The Boy in the Striped Pyjamas
 Man on Wire
 WALL-E

International Actor
 Robert Downey Jr. – Iron Man (Winner)
 Casey Affleck – Gone Baby Gone
 Josh Brolin – W.
 Ralph Fiennes – The Duchess

Pantene Best International Actress Award – People's Choice
 Meryl Streep – Mamma Mia! (Winner)
 Angelina Jolie – Changeling
 Kristin Scott Thomas – I've Loved You So Long
 Emma Thompson – Brideshead Revisited

Awards in Television Drama

Single Drama/Drama Serial
 Whistleblower (Winner)
 George Gently
 The Last Confession of Alexander Pearce
 Little White Lie
 School Run

Drama Series / Soap
 The Tudors (Winner)
 The Clinic
 Fair City
 Raw
 Ros na Rún

Director Television
 Ciaran Donnelly – The Tudors (Winner)
 Dermot Boyd – Whistleblower
 Dearbhla Walsh – Little Dorrit
 Kieron J. Walsh – Raw

Script Television
 Graham Linehan – The I.T. Crowd (Winner)
 Stuart Carolan & Barry Murphy – Little White Lie
 Rob Heyland – Whistleblower
 Peter McKenna – The Clinic

Actor in a Lead Role Television
 Aidan Gillen – The Wire (Winner)
 Dominic Mafham – The Clinic
 Jonathan Rhys Meyers –  The Tudors
 Stanley Townsend – Whistleblower

Actress in a Lead Role Television
 Charlene McKenna – Raw (Winner)
 Elaine Cassidy – Little White Lie
 Charlene McKenna –  Whistleblower
 Deirdre O'Kane – Bitter Sweet

Actor in a Supporting Role Television
 Peter O'Toole – The Tudors (Winner)
 Michael Fassbender – The Devil's Whore
 David Herlihy – The Clinic
 John Kavanagh – George Gently

Actress in a Supporting Role Television
 Maria Doyle Kennedy – The Tudors (Winner)
 Orla Brady – Mistresses
 Hilda Fay – Whistleblower
 Amy Huberman – The Clinic

Craft / Technical Awards

Costume Design
 Joan Bergin – The Tudors (Winner)
 Driscoll Calder – 32A
 Eimer Ní Mhaoldomhnaigh – Brideshead Revisited
 Leonie Prendergast – Kisses

Director of Photography
 PJ Dillon – 32A (Winner)
 Seamus Deasy – A Film with Me in It
 Owen McPolin – Little Dorrit
 Fergal O'Hanlon – Anton
Editing
 J. Patrick Duffner – Kisses (Winner)
 Shane Sutton – Fight or Flight
 Ben Yeates – Raw
 Gareth Young – Eden

Make Up & Hair – sponsored by M·A·C 
 Sharon Doyle & Dee Corcoran – The Tudors (Winner)
 Eileen Buggy & Morna Ferguson – George Gently
 Joni Galvin & Muriel Bell – Dorothy
 Liz Byrne – Kisses

Original Score
 David Holmes – Hunger (Winner)
 David Holmes – Cherrybomb
 Stephen McKeon – Niko and the Way to the Stars
 Anna Rice – Anton

Production Design
 Tom McCullagh – Hunger (Winner)
 Tom Conroy – The Tudors
 John Paul Kelly – The Other Boleyn Girl
 David Wilson – Dorothy

Sound
 Ronan Hill & Mervyn Moore – Hunger (Winner)
 Brendan Deasy – A Film with Me in It
 John Fitzgerald, Patrick Drummond & Caoimhe Doyle – Niko and the Way to the Stars
 Paul Maynes, Niall Brady & Garret Farrel – Waveriders

Awards in Television

Children's / Youth Programme
 Aifric (Winner)
 Aisling's Diary
 Funky Fables
 Quizone

Current Affairs
 Cocaine (Prime Time Investigates) (Winner)
 A Lost Boy (Spotlight)
 Slave Labour Ireland (Prime Time Investigates)
 Teen Bullying (Prime Time Investigates)

Documentary Series
 Bertie (Winner)
 Death or Canada
 How the Irish Have Sex
 Mobs Mhericeá

Single Documentary
 Cromwell in Ireland (Winner)
 Brian Keenan: Back to Beirut
 Patrick McCabe: Blood Relations
 Pimpernel sa Vatican

Entertainment Programme
 The Apprentice (Winner)
 The Panel
 The Podge and Rodge Show
 Tubridy Tonight

Factual Programme
 In the Name of the Fada (Winner)
 Ballet Chancers
 Celebrity Bainisteoir
 Who Do You Think You Are?

Sport
 Troid Fhuilteach (A Bloody Canvas) (Winner)
 Brief Encounters of the Sporting Mind
 Euro 2008
 Road to Croker... With Bertie Ahern

Others

Animation
 Granny O'Grimm's Sleeping Beauty (Winner)
 Days Like This
 Niko and the Way to the Stars
 On The Air: Hypnotised Hen

Short Film
 The Door (Winner)
 An Ranger
 Martin
Of Best Intentions

Special Irish Language
 In the Name of the Fada (Winner)
 Aifric
 Fairytale of Kathmandu
 Seacht

Rising Star Award, sponsored by Bord Scannán na hÉireann/the Irish Film Board
 Michael Fassbender – Actor (Winner)
 Sarah Bolger – Actor
 Lance Daly – Writer/Director
 Enda Walsh – Writer

Industry Lifetime Contribution Award
 George Morrison

References

2009 in Irish television
6